Ghastly Dorm ( or Hor Hue Hue, literally: "Heh heh dorm") is a Thai comedy horror film in 1992 produced and written by Bhandit Rittakol (uncredited in IMDb).

Plot
A college dorm is haunted by ghosts from WWII, when the building was a hospital. They are under evil and responsible for taking care of valuables.  Chaos arises when the students try to perform an exorcism.

Cast
Santisuk Promsiri as Chaithong
Chintara Sukapatana as Teacher Ladda 
Wachara Pan-Iom as Somprasong
Kiat Kitjaroen as Boriboon
Arun Pawilai as Yindee
Warut Woratham as Nammon
Ann Thongprasom as Sawittree
Anchalee Chaisiri as Rector
Sulaleewan Suwanatat as Master Thomya
Jukrit Ammarat as Ghost of Commander
Krit Sukramongkon

Release
It released on January 30, 1992 in nationwide theatres and aired on Channel 7 on June 10, 2013 at 8:00 a.m.

Adaptation
The film was adapted into a TV drama of the same name on Channel 3, broadcast every weekday from 6:30 to 8:00 p.m. in 2011 (after evening news: first edition) for a total of 16 episodes. It starred Vorarit Fuangarome, Jomkwan Leelapongprasuth, Nattaraht Maurice Legrand, Chaleumpol Tikumpornteerawong, Isariya Saisanan.

References

1992 films
Thai-language films
Thai comedy horror films
Five Star Production films
1990s comedy horror films
2011 Thai television series debuts
2011 Thai television series endings
Channel 3 (Thailand) original programming